Dimitrios Bougiouklis (born 12 May 1964) is a Greek former professional footballer who played as a midfielder.

References

1964 births
Living people
Greek footballers
Association football midfielders
Aris Thessaloniki F.C. players
Ethnikos Piraeus F.C. players
Kozani F.C. players
Olympiacos Volos F.C. players
Super League Greece players
Aris Thessaloniki F.C. managers
Greek football managers
People from Thessaloniki (regional unit)
Footballers from Central Macedonia